A series of mass sightings of celestial phenomena occurred in 1566 above Basel, Switzerland. The Basel pamphlet of 1566 describes unusual sunrises and sunsets. Celestial phenomena were said to have "fought" together in the form of numerous red and black balls in the sky before the rising sun. The report is discussed among historians and meteorologists. The phenomenon has been interpreted by some ufologists to be a sky battle between unidentified flying objects. The leaflet written by historian Samuel Coccius reported it as a religious event. The Basel pamphlet of 1566 is not the only one of its kind. In the 15th and 16th centuries, many leaflets wrote of "miracles" and "sky spectacles".

History 
The event is reported to have taken place in Basel, Switzerland in 1566. According to Samuel Coccius, on 27-28 July and 7 August, many local witnesses in Basel reported seeing three celestial phenomena. The first is described as an unusual sunrise, the second as a total eclipse of the moon with a red sun rising, and the third like a cloud of black spheres in front of the sun.

The phenomenon described 
The text of the broadsheet can be translated as giving the following description of the event:

See also
 1561 celestial phenomenon over Nuremberg

References 

Meteorological phenomena
16th century in the Old Swiss Confederacy
1566 in Europe
1566 in science
UFO sightings